Mourrah (also Moura and Mora) is a town and seat of the rural commune of Togué Mourari in the Cercle of Djenné in the Mopti Region of southern-central Mali. The weekly market is held on a Sunday. Moura's population is around 10,000.

See also 

 Siege of Moura, which occurred in the settlement

References

Populated places in Mopti Region